No Format! is an independent record label based in Paris founded in 2004 by Laurent Bizot, joined in 2007 by Thibaut Mullings.

The label seeks to invest in original musical projects, be they instrumental or vocal, and has built up a catalogue of 22 works since its inception. Among them, the duets between artists with a traditional west African musical background and artists more familiar with western traditions (Chamber Music by Ballaké Sissoko and Vincent Segal), but also albums by singer-songwriters (Chocolate Genius, Inc., Mélissa Laveaux or Solo Piano by Chilly Gonzales to name a few).
In 2016 No Format! was recognized as one of Europe's most inspiring young label and was selected by IMPALA and The Independent Echo for the FIVEUNDERFIFTEEN campaign.

Since 2016 No Format! has released and distributed over 46 albums, EPs and singles in partnership with the many of their signed artists.

Artists 
ALA.NI
Ballaké Sissoko and Vincent Segal
Chocolate Genius, Inc.
Faya Dub
Chilly Gonzales
Kyrie Kristmanson
Lansiné Kouyaté and David Neerman
Julia Sarr
Mamani Keïta
Mélissa Laveaux
Misja Fitzgerald Michel
Nicolas Repac
Rocé
Gerald Toto, Richard Bona, Lokua Kanza

References

External links 
 Official website
 YouTube channel

French record labels
French independent record labels